Nambugun: North Korean Partisan in South Korea is a 1990 South Korean war drama film directed by Chung Ji-young. It is based upon the experiences of Lee Tae, a war correspondent and pro-North Korean Partisan during the Korean War.

Cast 
 Ahn Sung-ki ... Lee Tae
 Choi Jin-sil ... Park Min-ja
 Choi Min-soo ... Kim Young
 Lee Hye-young ... Kim Hee-suk

See also
 The Taebaek Mountains

References

External links 
 

1990 films
1990 drama films
South Korean biographical films
South Korean war drama films
Korean War films
Biographical films about journalists
Films about war correspondents
Films based on biographies
Films based on Korean novels
Films based on military novels
Films directed by Chung Ji-young
1990s Korean-language films